"Wrong Number" is a song by English rock band The Cure, released as a single on 17 November 1997 from the band's Galore compilation.

Music video

A music video was released, directed by Tim Pope and featuring the band playing in a place with powder all around, Robert Smith getting married, floating faces in space and Robert being surrounded by a snake.

Track listing
UK CD
 "Wrong Number" – 6:02
 "Wrong Number (Analogue Exchange Mix)" – 4:49
 "Wrong Number (p2p Mix)" – 8:12
 "Wrong Number (Crossed Line Mix)" – 8:34
 "Wrong Number (ISDN Mix)" – 7:08

European CD
 "Wrong Number" – 6:02
 "Wrong Number (Analogue Exchange Mix)" – 4:49
 "Wrong Number (Digital Exchange Mix)" – 7:08
 "Wrong Number (Dub Analogue Exchange Mix)" – 5:34

UK 12"

Side A

 Wrong Number
 Wrong Number (Dub Analogue Exchange Mix)
 Wrong Number (Engaged Mix)

Side B

 Wrong Number (p2p Mix)
 Wrong Number (Digital Exchange Mix)

Versions & Remixes
 Wrong Number 6:02
 Wrong Number (Radio Mix) 4:24 
 Wrong Number (Digital Exchange Mix) 7:09
 Wrong Number (Analogue Exchange Mix) 4:50
 Wrong Number (Dub Analogue Exchange Mix) 5:55
 Wrong Number (Isdn Mix) 7:08
 Wrong Number (Crossed Line Mix) 8:35
 Wrong Number (Engaged Mix) 6:32
 Wrong Number (P2P Mix) 8:12
 Wrong Number (Acoustic Mix) 5:55
 Wrong Number (16b (Crossed Line) Warm Vocal Mix) 5:30 (Only available on Greatest Hits Rarities)

Personnel

Robert Smith – vocals, guitar, bass, keyboards
Jason Cooper – drums 
Reeves Gabrels – guitar

Chart performance

References

External links
 

The Cure songs
1997 singles
Songs written by Robert Smith (musician)
Music videos directed by Tim Pope
1997 songs
Fiction Records singles